Hangala  is a village in the southern state of Karnataka, India. It is located in the Gundlupet taluk of Chamarajanagar district.

Demographics
 India census, Hangala had a population of 5,597 with 2,835 males and 2,762 females.

Country Code and STD Code  
+91 08229

Tourist attractions
Gopalaswamy Hills is 18 km from Hangala.

Image gallery

See also
 Chamarajanagar
 Districts of Karnataka

References

External links
 http://Chamarajanagar.nic.in/

Villages in Chamarajanagar district